Richard James Fromberg (born 28 April 1970) is a former professional tennis player from Australia.

Tennis career
Fromberg began playing tennis at the age of 10. He was an Australian Institute of Sport scholarship holder.	In 1987, he reached the Australian Open Junior finals in both singles and doubles. He turned professional in 1988. In 1990, he won his first top-level singles title in at Bologna, and his first tour doubles title in Schenectady, New York.

Fromberg played for Australia in two Davis Cup finals during his career. In 1990 he was part of the team which lost 3–2 in the final to the United States (winning one singles rubber against Michael Chang, and losing another in five sets to Andre Agassi). In 1993 he was on the team which lost 4–1 in the final to Germany (winning one singles match-up against Marc-Kevin Goellner, and losing the other to Michael Stich). He had an 11–4 career Davis Cup record (10–4 in singles and 1–0 in doubles).

Fromberg's best performances at Grand Slam events came in reaching the fourth round of the Australian Open in 1993 and 1998.

During his career, Fromberg won four singles titles and two doubles titles. His career-high singles ranking was World No. 24 (in 1990). His career prize money totalled .

ATP career finals

Singles: 11 (4 titles, 7 runner-ups)

Doubles: 2 (2 titles)

ATP Challenger and ITF Futures finals

Singles: 10 (10–0)

Doubles: 3 (3–0)

Junior Grand Slam finals

Doubles: 1 (1 runner-up)

Performance timelines

Singles

Doubles

References

External links 
 
 
 
 

Australian male tennis players
Hopman Cup competitors
Olympic tennis players of Australia
People from Ulverstone, Tasmania
Tennis people from Tasmania
Tennis players at the 1992 Summer Olympics
1970 births
Living people
Australian people of German descent
Australian Institute of Sport tennis players